Khoinarev may refer to:
 Khunirud
 Khaneqah, Khoda Afarin